Untappd is a geosocial networking service and mobile phone application founded by Greg Avola and Tim Mather that allows its users to check in as they drink beers, and share these check-ins and their locations with their friends. It incorporates aspects of gamification.

Untappd provides a platform for users to rate the beer they are consuming, earn badges, share pictures of their beers, review tap lists from nearby venues, see what beers their friends are drinking, comment on checked-in beers, and ask the app to suggest similar beverages. In 2016, an updated version of the application allowed users to find a beer by scanning its barcode and hail an Uber directly to the venue they had checked into to reduce DUIs.

Untappd can share checkins with Twitter and Facebook accounts of its users, and can pull in locations from Foursquare.

Badges
As a user checks in different beers, they receive different badges. These badges are divided into beer badges, venue badges and special badges. Beer badges, for instance, are based upon how many different beers a user has consumed (for example 100, 500, 1,000), five different beers from one country, five of a type like amber or wit, or it can be six check-ins of one beer. Venue badges are for checking in at locations such as different bars, different bars in one night, sport venues and so on. Special badges are available when a beer is checked in on special days like National Beer Day, Christmas, New Year's Eve, or Untappd's anniversary.

History
Untappd started in 2010 at Fathers Office in Santa Monica, California. On January 17, 2014 it was announced that Untappd had passed the 1 million user mark and by April 2016, they had 3.2 million users.

On January 15, 2016, Untappd announced that it would become a subsidiary of Next Glass, a beer and wine rating and suggesting application. Both companies indicated their applications will remain independent, but will benefit from increased data integrations.

It was included in the "Top 50 Apps of the Year" of 2016 by Time.

At the start of the COVID-19 pandemic on March 25, 2020, the Untappd at Home campaign was launched, so users could check in to drinks from home, without having to be in the same physical location. 

As of September 4th, 2020 Untappd reported 820,000 unique users checked-in at least once from almost 180 different countries.

In 2021, a Sacbee article reported that a local brewery's business was impacted by low ratings on the app.

See also
 Beer rating

References

External links
Official website

Software companies of the United States
Beer culture
IOS software
Android (operating system) software
Geosocial networking
Windows Phone software